Coryphantha alversonii, commonly known as the foxtail cactus, is a stem succulent plant in the genus Coryphantha of the cactus family (Cactaceae).

The cactus is endemic to southern California, found only in the mountain ranges of the southern Mojave Desert.

Description
Coryphantha alversonii has black tipped spines and lavender flowers.

It is vulnerable species on the California Native Plant Society Inventory of Rare and Endangered Plants.

References

External links
Calflora Database: Coryphantha alversonii (Foxtail cactus)

alversonii
Cacti of the United States
Endemic flora of California
Flora of the California desert regions
Natural history of the Mojave Desert
Taxa named by John Merle Coulter
Flora without expected TNC conservation status